DSB may refer to:

Science, technology and devices
 DsbA, a bacterial member of the Dsb (disulfide bond) family of enzymes
 Double strand break, a break in both DNA strands, part of DNA repair
 in telecommunications, double-sideband transmission
Double-sideband suppressed-carrier transmission (DSB-SC)
Double-sideband reduced-carrier transmission (DSB-RC)
 Dictionary of Scientific Biography, a multivolume reference work edited by Charles Coulston Gillespie
 Defense Science Board, of the United States
 Dsb, the warm-summer Mediterranean continental climate in the Köppen climate classification

Institutions, companies, products and trademarks
 Dispute Settlement Body, of the World Trade Organization
 DSB (railway company) (Danske Statsbaner), a Danish train operating company
 Deutsche Schallplatten Berlin, another name of VEB Deutsche Schallplatten
 Deutsche Schule Bratislava, a German international school in Bratislava, Slovakia
 Deutscher Schützenbund, the German Shooting and Archery Federation
 De Surinaamsche Bank, Suriname
 DSB Bank (Dirk Scheringa Beheer), Netherlands
 DSB Stadion, a football stadium in Alkmaar, Netherlands sponsored by the above bank
 DSB International School, a German school in Mumbai, India
 Dutch Safety Board, a Netherlands investigation agency
 Norwegian Directorate for Civil Protection (Direktoratet for samfunnssikkerhet og beredskap), a Norwegian government organization
 German International School of Cairo (Deutsche Schule der Borromäerinnen Kairo), Egypt
 German School Beirut (Deutsche Schule Beirut), Lebanon

Others
 ISO 639-2 or SIL International language code for the Lower Sorbian language - Dolnoserbski
 Department Store Battles, a modification for Battlefield 2, a computer game by the Swedish developer Digital Illusions CE (DICE)
 Dark square bishop, in chess
 "Don't Stop Believin'", a song by American rock band Journey
 Democrats for a Strong Bulgaria, a Bulgarian political party established in 2004 by Ivan Kostov
 Department of Internal Security or Departamenta sobstvennoi bezopasnosti of the Russian Ministry of Internal Affairs which is a very small internal affairs unit by Western standards and was formed November 5, 2004, to prevent and detect corruption and crimes by Russian federal civil servants and members and employees of the Russian Ministry of Internal Affairs
 Don Salvador Benedicto, a municipality in the province of Negros Occidental, Philippines